Cercle Sportif Oberkorn is an association football club based in Oberkorn, in south-west Luxembourg. As of the 2017–18 season, they play in the 2. Division, the fourth top tier of Luxembourg football league.

References
Luxembourg Football Federation

External links
Club official website

Oberkorn